"N Everything" is an Al Jolson song by songwriters B.G. "Buddy" DeSylva and Gus Kahn. Jolson adapted the song with improvisation as performances of Sinbad progressed, leading Jolson to eventually be given co-lyricist credit on the song. The success of N Everything" prompted Jolson to ask DeSylva for further songs. And DeSylva complied with his request to write some songs, including "I'll Say She Does", again with Kahn and Jolson listed as his collaborators.

History
Jolson recorded N Everything" in 1917 and then interpolated the song into Sinbad at New York's Winter Garden Theatre in 1918.

References

1917 songs
Al Jolson songs
Songs with lyrics by Gus Kahn
Songs with lyrics by Buddy DeSylva